Dermatiscum is a genus of lichenized fungi in the family Caliciaceae. The genus contains two species found in South Africa and North America.

References

Caliciales
Caliciales genera
Lichen genera
Taxa named by William Nylander (botanist)